The Royal New Zealand Air Force (RNZAF) is organised into a small number of flying squadrons and ground-based units. Most of the RNZAF's operational and training units are stationed at RNZAF Base Auckland and RNZAF Base Ohakea in the North Island. Several training and maintenance units are located at RNZAF Base Woodbourne in the South Island.

Second World War
During the Second World War, three groups were formed: Northern Group RNZAF, in the North of the North Island (HQ Auckland), Central Group RNZAF (HQ Wellington), in the South of the North Island, and Southern Group RNZAF (HQ Christchurch), in the South Island. They were in the process of formation by February 1942. In August 1942 these Group HQs were raised to the status of Air HQs and placed under Air Commodores.

In September 1943 the RNZAF reached its peak strength in New Zealand. By this time establishments included Air Headquarters in Wellington, the three group headquarters, and a total of thirty-three stations and depots throughout the country. The Group Headquarters were combined headquarters and housed Navy and Army as well as Air Force staffs. Northern and Central Groups were operational in function, and were equipped with filter rooms and fighter operations rooms, while Southern Group was primarily responsible for training. Northern Group, besides administering stations in New Zealand, also controlled Norfolk Island, where a radar unit and a servicing section catered for transient aircraft.

At that time Northern Group administered RNZAF Station Waipapakauri, RNZAF Station Onerahi, RNZAF Station Whenuapai, and the stations at Mangere, Seagrove, Hamilton, Te Awamutu, Rotorua, Tauranga, and Swanson. No. 1 Stores Depot RNZAF moved on 10 April 1943 from the Exhibition Hall in central Hamilton to the northern outskirts of Hamilton, where RNZAF Station Te Rapa was established. Air Commodore Maurice Buckley commanded Northern Group from Auckland in 1942–43. Between April 1944-31 March 1945, the station at Tauranga was vacated.

Later, No. 1 (Islands) Group RNZAF served in the Solomon Islands.

Air Commodore James Findlay served as Air Officer Commanding Central Group from 1942. Central Group was suspended in October 1943, and its functions shared between Air Headquarters and the other two groups. Northern and Southern Groups were disbanded in October 1944.

Northern Group, July 1943
Fighter Ops Room/Filter Room/COIC, Auckland

Through much of the postwar period the RNZAF was administered through two groups. At RNZAF Station Wigram in the outskirts of Christchurch was Training Group RNZAF (active by May 1948–early 1970s at least) responsible for training and support. By 1988 Training Group had become Support Group RNZAF, which included No. 1 Stores Depot RNZAF at RNZAF Te Rapa and No. 1 Repair Depot RNZAF at RNZAF Base Woodbourne (New Zealand Official Yearbooks). Operations Group RNZAF at Auckland at one time supervised Strike, Transport and Maritime Operations Wings. Operations Group was formed on 1 July 1965, initially under the command of Air Commodore K.W. Trigance.

A skeleton listing of RNZAF units, grouped under Operations Group and Support Group and seemingly circa 1984, can be seen at Desmond Ball's "The Anzac Connection."

Operations Group and Support Group were merged into Air Command, under an official who was to be called the "RNZAF Air Commander" but in common reference was usually known as AOC Air Command, on 30 April 1995.

Current structure

The RNZAF includes the following units. Note that the organisational structure below is likely to contain some omissions and inaccuracies. In particular, Ground Training and Nos 485 and 488 Wings were disestablished in early 2015 and replaced by Base Commanders.
As part of the same reorganisation, the headquarters of No. 209  (Expeditionary Support) Squadron was disestablished, and its RNZAF Force Protection, air movements, aviation refuelling, and other sub-units reassigned. Woodbourne was the first base to make the change, synchronised with a routine change of command; Ohakea and Auckland followed.

 Chief of Air Force (Wellington)
 Air Staff
 Air Component Commander
 Base Commander Auckland
 No. 5 Squadron (6 x P-3K2 Orion)
 No. 6 Squadron (8 x SH-2G Super Seasprite)
 No. 40 Squadron (5 x C-130H Hercules, 2 x Boeing 757-200)
 No. 230 (Mission Support) Squadron
 Parachute Training Support Unit
 Operations Squadron Auckland
 Base Commander Ohakea
 No. 3 Squadron (A-109 T/LUH, NH90 MUH)
 No. 42 Squadron (4 x Super King Air 350)
 Flying Training
 Central Flying School
 No. 14 Squadron (11 x T-6 Texan II)
 Operations Squadron Ohakea
 Ground Training Wing (RNZAF Base Woodbourne)
 Command Training School
 Aeronautical Training Squadron
 Basic Training Flight
 Aircraft Training Flight
 Electro-Technology Training Squadron
 Electro-Technology Training Flight
 Operational Training Flight
 Support Training Squadron
 Operations Squadron Woodbourne
 Logistics Command (Air)
 Maintenance Wing

References
Citations

Works consulted

Royal New Zealand Air Force
Structure of contemporary air forces